Erica Wheeler (born May 2, 1991) is an American professional basketball player for the Indiana Fever of the Women's National Basketball Association (WNBA).  Wheeler was undrafted out of Rutgers, but eventually made her way into the WNBA in 2015.

Early years
Wheeler grew up in the Miami neighborhood of Liberty City. Liberty City is one of the worst, most crime-ridden inner cities in America, and Wheeler saw two of her close friends die when she was young. Wheeler attended Parkway Academy and was a member of the basketball team there.

College career
Wheeler committed to play at Rutgers in 2009.  Rutgers reached the NCAA Tournament in each of her first three seasons.  Wheeler contributed as a junior, leading the team in steals, and averaging just under 10 points per game. Prior to her senior year, Wheeler's mother died of cancer.  However, Wheeler finished her senior season and graduated from Rutgers.

Rutgers statistics
Source

Professional career

WNBA
Wheeler earned a try-out in 2015 for the Atlanta Dream after not being selected in the WNBA Draft. Wheeler appeared in 17 games for the Dream in 2015, but was eventually cut.  Wheeler then moved to the New York Liberty, and appeared three times. In 2016, Wheeler was signed after training camp by the Indiana Fever.  Wheeler started 25 games for the Fever  In 2017, Wheeler continued with the Fever and was second on the team in scoring, and led the team in assists. In 2019, Wheeler became the first undrafted player ever in the WNBA to be named All-Star Game MVP.

Before the start of the 2020 WNBA season, Wheeler tested positive for COVID-19, and developed health complications including fluid buildup around her heart. She was not cleared to resume playing basketball again until October, missing the entire COVID-shortened 2020 season, which ended October 6.  

Prior to the start of the 2021 WNBA season, Wheeler signed as a free agent with the Los Angeles Sparks to be their new starting point guard.

Overseas
Wheeler signed with Fabio Jardine who facilitated her move to the Brazilian league. Wheeler continued to play overseas in the WNBA offseason making appearances in Puerto Rico, Turkey, and Brazil.

After missing the 2020 WNBA season due to COVID, Wheeler signed with Turkey's Izmit Belediyespor and played in 16 games of their 2020-21 season and ranking second on the team with 15.1 points per game.

WNBA career statistics

Regular season

|-
| style="text-align:left;"| 2015
| style="text-align:left;"| Atlanta
| 17 || 0 || 11.9 || .457 || .400 || .500 || 0.9 || 1.5 || 0.5 || 0.0 || 1.2 || 4.5
|-
| style="text-align:left;"| 2015
| style="text-align:left;"| New York
| 3 || 0 || 8.7 || .385 || .000 || 1.000 || 1.3 || 0.3 || 1.3 || 0.0 || 2.0 || 4.7
|-
| style="text-align:left;"| 2016
| style="text-align:left;"| Indiana
| 34 || 25 || 23.9 || .418 || .298 || .833 || 2.1 || 2.8 || 0.6 || 0.0 || 2.0 || 8.4
|-
| style="text-align:left;"| 2017
| style="text-align:left;"| Indiana
| 34 || 26 || 26.4 || .400 || .331 || .792 || 3.0 || 4.1 || 1.4 || 0.0 || 2.2 || 11.8
|-
| style="text-align:left;"| 2018
| style="text-align:left;"| Indiana
| 34 || 22 || 21.7 || .351 || .276 || .797 || 2.9 || 4.1 || 0.8 || 0.2 || 1.4 || 7.8
|-
| style="text-align:left;"| 2019
| style="text-align:left;"| Indiana
| 34 || 34 || 25.0 || .426 || .384 || .872 || 3.0 || 5.0 || 1.2 || 0.1 || 2.9 || 10.1
|-
| style="text-align:left;"| 2021
| style="text-align:left;"| Los Angeles
| 32 || 32 || 30.2 || .417 || .359 || .827 || 3.1 || 4.8 || 1.3 || 0.3 || 2.7 || 13.6
|-
| style="text-align:left;"| 2022
| style="text-align:left;"| Atlanta
| 30 || 30 || 26.3 || .355 || .329 || .756 || 3.1 || 3.9 || 1.1 || 0.1 || 2.5 || 8.4
|-
| style="text-align:left;"| Career
| style="text-align:left;"| 7 years, 4 teams
| 218 || 169 || 24.2 || .398  || .355 || .807 || 2.6 || 3.9 || 1.0 || 0.1 || 2.2 || 9.5

Playoffs

|-
| style="text-align:left;"| 2015
| style="text-align:left;"| New York
| 3 || 0 || 2.7 || .333 || .000 || .000 || 0.3 || 0.0 || 0.0 || 0.0 || 0.6 || 0.7
|-
| style="text-align:left;"| 2016
| style="text-align:left;"| Indiana
| 1 || 1 || 25.6 || .500 || 1.000 || 1.000 || 3.0 || 3.0 || 0.0 || 0.0 || 1.0 || 10.0
|-
| style="text-align:left;"| Career
| style="text-align:left;"|2 years, 2 teams
| 4 || 1 || 8.4 || .444 || 1.000 || 1.000 || 1.0 || 0.8 || 0.0 || 0.0 || 0.8 || 3.0

References

External links
WNBA Bio
Eurobasket profile

1991 births
Living people
American women's basketball players
Atlanta Dream players
Basketball players from Miami
Indiana Fever players
LGBT basketball players
LGBT people from Florida
Lesbian sportswomen
Los Angeles Sparks players
New York Liberty players
Point guards
Rutgers Scarlet Knights women's basketball players
Shooting guards
Women's National Basketball Association All-Stars
Undrafted Women's National Basketball Association players